National Significant Numbers (NSN): eight digits

A new numbering plan took effect in 2010.
The minimum number length (excluding the country code) is 3 digits.
The maximum number length (excluding the country code) is 8 digits.

Allocations in Qatar

Before changes

After changes

See also
 Telecommunications in Qatar

References

Qatar
Telecommunications in Qatar
Qatar communications-related lists